The 2016 FEU Tamaraws Men's Basketball Team represents Far Eastern University during the University Athletic Association of the Philippines' 79th season in men's basketball division. The Tamaraws are led by their fourth year coach Nash Racela.

The Tamaraws are looking to defend their crown this season, facing a great challenge with core players like Mac Belo, Mike Tolomia and Russel Escoto leaving the team due to graduation, FEU parades a lineup with half of the team are newcomers.

Departures

Roster

Team depth chart

Rotation

Schedule

|-
!colspan=12 style="background:#006400; color:#FFD700;"| UAAP Season 79 First Round

|-
!colspan=12 style="background:#006400; color:#FFD700;"| UAAP Season 79 Second Round

|-
!colspan=12 style="background:#006400; color:#FFD700;"| UAAP Season 79 Final Four

Statistics
Updated: October 5, 2016

Source: PBA-Online.net

References

FEU Tamaraws basketball seasons
Tam